Deli Company (Chinese:得力; pinyin: dé lì , anglicized /dәˈliː/) is a Chinese stationery manufacturing company based in Ningbo, Zhejiang. Deli is a well-known brand in China, thanks to its national advertisement campaign that is broadcast on CCTV, inviting Yang Lan to participate as the brand ambassador. The company to be the leader in China's stationery market, selling its products to more than 45,000 stores nationwide. Deli also leads the industry's e-commerce business through a strong presence on Tmall and JD.com.

History 
The company was established as a private enterprise in 1988 in Ninghai, China. In 1988, Deli began manufacturing pen stands, and today the company manufactures a wide range of office and school products.

Deli brand started to export its products to Japan in 1997. Today, Deli sell its products in more than 100 countries and developed 8 branches and studios in Japan, USA, UAE, Indonesia, Poland, Egypt, Korea and Germany.

Products 
The following chart contains all of Deli products

Awards 

 In 2015, Deli ranked among the top 500 manufacturers in China (#398);
 In 2015, Deli ranked among the top 500 private enterprises in China (#492);
 In 2016, Deli was awarded the iF award for product design;
In 2017, Deli ranked among the top 500 private enterprises in China (#316);
In 2018, Deli ranked among the top 500 manufacturers in China (#186);
In 2018, Deli ranked among the top 500 private enterprises in China (#326);

Endorsements 
 TV personality and journalist, Yang Lan, became Deli's official spokesperson in 2015;
 TV personality and anchor, Chen Luyu, became Deli's official spokesperson in 2012 to 2014.
 Officially designated stationery supplier of G20 Summit in Hangzhou in 2016
Chinese singer and songwriter , Roy Wang, became Deli's official spokesperson in October, 2021.

References

External links 
 

Chinese brands
Office supply companies of China
Stationery
Chinese companies established in 1988
Fountain pen and ink manufacturers
Companies based in Ningbo